Empyreuma  is a genus of tiger moths in the family Erebidae, containing three closely related species. The name is derived from the Greek word , meaning "a live coal covered with ashes".

Species
Empyreuma anassa Forbes, 1917
Empyreuma heros Bates, 1934
Empyreuma pugione (Linnaeus, 1767) – spotted oleander caterpillar moth

References

Euchromiina
Moth genera